Francis Joseph Fleming (born 21 December 1945) was an English footballer who played in the Football League for Darlington as a goalkeeper.

Fleming was born in South Shields in 1945. He joined Darlington in July 1964, and made two senior appearances, both in the Fourth Division as a stand-in for regular goalkeeper Jimmy O'Neill. His debut came on 3 October 1964, in a 3–1 defeat away to Bradford Park Avenue, and he kept his place for the next match before O'Neill returned to the side.

References

1945 births
Living people
Footballers from South Shields
English footballers
Association football goalkeepers
Darlington F.C. players
English Football League players